S-189 is a Project 613B diesel submarine of the Soviet Navy.

She is currently preserved as a museum ship in Saint Petersburg.

References

Bibliography

External links 
Книга памяти - S-189 

Whiskey-class submarines
Ships built in the Soviet Union
Cold War submarines of the Soviet Union
Soviet submarine accidents
Museum ships in Russia
1954 ships